Marie Panthès (3 November 1871 – 11 March 1955) was a French pianist, specializing in romantic piano, especially the interpretation of the works of Frédéric Chopin.

Life 

Panthès was born in Odessa (Russian Empire) of French parents. She studied the piano at the Conservatoire de Paris in an upper grade class, then with Henry Fissot and Louise-Aglaé Massart-Masson where she won first prize at the age of 14. In 1897, she toured with the violinist Alexandre Petschnikoff and became famous thanks to numerous European tours.

In 1904, she began teaching at the Conservatoire de musique de Genève. She then left this post in 1917 because of differences of opinion with the conservatory committee. She moved with her violinist husband, Maurice Darier, to Lausanne. She returned to Geneva in 1931 and taught for twenty years at the Conservatoire de musique de Genève. In 1951, she said she stopped because she suffered from a melanoma in her head. In 1954, she began treatment with a cancer specialist in New York, Dr. Revici. She died there on 11 March 1955 at the age of 83. Her grave is located at Cimetière des Rois in Geneva.

Among her notable students were Julien-François Zbinden, Johnny Aubert, Isabelle Nef and Marguerite Roesgen-Champion.

Further reading 
 Oscar Thompson (ed.), Nicolas Slonimsky (ed.): The International Cyclopedia of Music and Musicians, 4th edition, Dodd, Mead & Company, New York 1946
  Arthur Eaglefield-Hull (ed.) and Alfred Einstein (transl. and adaptation): "Panthès, Marie", in Das Neue Musik-Lexikon. Nach dem Dictionary of Modern Music and Musicians. Max Hesses Verlag, Berlin 1926, . (Online)
  Hugo Riemann: "Panthès, Marie", in Riemann Musiklexikon, 11th edition, Max Hesses Verlag, Berlin 1929, . (Online)

References

External links 
 Sketch of Marie Panthès on Gallica

19th-century French women classical pianists
Swiss classical pianists
20th-century classical pianists
Musicians from Odesa
1871 births
1955 deaths
Conservatoire de Paris alumni
Deaths from skin cancer